This is a list of the National Register of Historic Places listings in Dane County, Wisconsin. It aims to provide a comprehensive listing of buildings, sites, structures, districts, and objects in Dane County, Wisconsin listed on the National Register of Historic Places.

The locations of National Register properties for which the latitude and longitude coordinates are included below may be seen in a map.

There are 256 properties and districts listed on the National Register in Dane County, including 10 National Historic Landmarks. 154 of these properties and districts, including 8 of the National Historic Landmarks, are located in the city of Madison; these are listed separately, while the remaining 102 properties and districts are listed below. An additional site was once listed on the National Register but has been removed.

Current listings

|}

Former listing

|}

See also 

 List of National Historic Landmarks in Wisconsin
 National Register of Historic Places listings in Wisconsin
 Listings in neighboring counties: Columbia, Dodge, Green, Iowa, Jefferson, Rock, Sauk
 National Historic Preservation Act of 1966
 Wisconsin Historical Society

References

External links 
 Historic Madison, Inc.
 Madison Landmarks Commission
 Madison Trust for Historic Preservation

 
Dane